The 2013–14 Texas Southern Lady Tigers basketball team represented Texas Southern University during the 2013–14 NCAA Division I women's basketball season. The Tigers, led by first year head coach Johnetta Hayes, played their home games at the Health and Physical Education Arena and were members of the Southwestern Athletic Conference. The Tigers would make their first ever Tournament final and qualify for their second straight WNIT. The Tigers would finish the season 20–13.

Roster

Schedule

|-
!colspan=9| Regular Season

|-
!colspan=9| 2014 SWAC women's basketball tournament

|-
!colspan=9| 2014 Women's National Invitation Tournament

See also
2013–14 Texas Southern Tigers basketball team

References

Texas Southern
Texas Southern Lady Tigers basketball seasons
2014 Women's National Invitation Tournament participants